Goran Perišić  (Cyrillic: Горан Пepишић, born 6 December 1976 in Podgorica, former Titograd, SR Montenegro, SFR Yugoslavia) is a Montenegrin retired football defender.

Club career
Perišić began his career with FK Budućnost Podgorica in the First League of Serbia and Montenegro, appearing in over 100 league matches between 1994 and 2001. He had spells in the Greek Beta Ethniki with Larissa F.C. during the 1999–00 season and Ethnikos Asteras F.C. during the 2002–03 season.

References

External links
 Buducnost Podgorica squad (2006–2007) at eufo.de
 

1976 births
Living people
Footballers from Podgorica
Association football defenders
Serbia and Montenegro footballers
Montenegrin footballers
FK Budućnost Podgorica players
Athlitiki Enosi Larissa F.C. players
Olympiacos Volos F.C. players
FK Zabjelo players
FK Mornar players
Ethnikos Asteras F.C. players
FK Kom players
First League of Serbia and Montenegro players
Football League (Greece) players
Second League of Serbia and Montenegro players
Montenegrin First League players
Serbia and Montenegro expatriate footballers
Expatriate footballers in Greece
Serbia and Montenegro expatriate sportspeople in Greece
Montenegrin football managers
FK Budućnost Podgorica managers
OFK Titograd managers